The Bladen Lake Group is a group of lakes located in southeastern North Carolina. The largest, Lake Waccamaw, is the largest of the natural Carolina Bay lakes. There are several lakes included in this group, and all are water-filled Carolina Bays. All of the lakes are oval and oriented in the same direction, a feature common to the Carolina Bays.

Lake groups of the United States
Lakes of North Carolina
Bodies of water of Columbus County, North Carolina